Perrero (Occitan: Lo Perrier, French: Le Perrier) is a comune (municipality) in the Metropolitan City of Turin in the Italian region Piedmont, located about  southwest of Turin.  

Perrero borders the following municipalities: Roure, Perosa Argentina, Massello, Pomaretto, Salza di Pinerolo, Prali, Pramollo, Angrogna, and Villar Pellice.

History
In 1928, the Mussolini regime annexed to Perrero seven other communes (Bovile, Chiabrano, Faetto, Maniglia, Riclaretto, San Martino di Perrero and Traverse).

References

Cities and towns in Piedmont